Kelch (from the Flemish for chalice) may refer to:

 Kelch motif, a region of protein sequence
Kelch proteins, which contain multiple Kelch motifs
 A type of beer glass or goblet, used for Trappist ales
Kelch (surname)